Hans-Olof Harald Johansson (18 March 1936 – 18 February 2022) was a Swedish sprinter. He competed in the 4 × 400 m relay at the 1960 Summer Olympics and 1962 European Athletics Championships and finished fourth in 1962. He won the national 400 m title in 1961, and set a new national record in this event, in a semifinal of the 1962 European Championships.

References

1936 births
2022 deaths
Swedish male sprinters
Olympic athletes of Sweden
Athletes (track and field) at the 1960 Summer Olympics
Sportspeople from Södermanland County
People from Katrineholm Municipality
20th-century Swedish people